Bolivia national under-20 football team represents Bolivia in international football competitions such as South American Youth Championship.

Current squad

References

Under
South American national under-20 association football teams